Quratulain Balouch is a Pakistani American singer-songwriter. Also known as QB or the Humsafar Girl, she became popular for her title track "Woh Humsafar Tha" in Hum TV's serial Humsafar.

Career
Balouch has no formal music education. She grew up listening to Nusrat Fateh Ali Khan, Muhammad Juman, Pathanay Khan and others.

Her singing career started with her cover of Reshma's "Ankhian Nu Ren De" in 2011. She came into the limelight when she featured alongside Jal in the song "Panchi" as part of season 4 of Coke Studio. She rose to fame after her award-winning performance of "Woh Humsafar Tha" for 2011 drama serial Humsafar.

In 2012, she represented her country in a live performance with the BBC Philharmonic Orchestra. In 2016, she made her debut in Bollywood with song "Kaari Kaari" in film Pink.

Discography

Soundtracks

Coke Studio Pakistan

Others

Awards and nominations

|-
! style="background:#bfd7ff" colspan="4"|Lux Style Awards
|-
|rowspan="2"|2012
|rowspan="2"|"Woh Humsafar Tha" – Humsafar
|Song of the Year
|
|-
|Best Original Soundtrack
| 
|-
|rowspan="2"|2017
|"Saaiyaan"
|Song of the Year
|
|-
|"Tere Naal Mein Laiyan" – Mann Mayal
|Best Original Soundtrack
|
|-
|2018
|"Chal Diye" – #CornettoPopRock2
|Song of the Year (shared with Ali Azmat)
|
|-
! style="background:#bfd7ff" colspan="4"|Pakistan Media Awards
|-
|2012
|"Woh Humsafar Tha" – Humsafar
|Singer of the Year (Female)
|
|-
! style="background:#bfd7ff" colspan="4"|Hum Awards
|-
|rowspan="2"|2013
|"Woh Humsafar Tha" – Humsafar
|Hum Honorary Phenomenal Serial Award
|
|-
|"Roshan Sitara" – Roshan Sitara
|Hum Award for Best Original Soundtrack
|
|-
! style="background:#bfd7ff" colspan="4"|Achievement Award
|-
|2011
|"Woh Humsafar Tha" – Humsafar
|Pakistan's Youngest Achievement Award
|
|-
! style="background:#bfd7ff" colspan="4"|Filmfare Awards
|-
|2017
|"Kaari Kaari" – Pink
|Filmfare Award for Best Female Playback Singer
|
|-
! style="background:#bfd7ff" colspan="4"|Mirchi Music Awards
|-
| rowspan=2 | 2016
| rowspan=2 | "Kaari Kaari" – Pink
| Female Vocalist of The Year
| 
|-
| Upcoming Female Vocalist of The Year
|
|-
! style="background:#bfd7ff" colspan="4"|International Pakistan Prestige Awards
|-
|2017
|"Tere Naal Mein Laiyan" – Mann Mayal
|Best Singer
|
|}

References

External links

Baloch people
Living people
21st-century Pakistani actresses
Punjabi-language singers
Pakistani emigrants to the United States
21st-century Pakistani women singers
Year of birth missing (living people)